The Koizumi family has been prominent in Japanese politics since the early 1900s.  Notable members of this family include:

 Matajirō Koizumi (1865–1951) – Minister of Posts and Telecommunications, he was known as the "wild man" and "tattoo minister" because of a large dragon Irezumi tattoo on his back. While many other politicians of his era descended from the samurai class, Matajirō's father Yoshibe Koizumi was a scaffolder and commoner.
 Jun'ya Koizumi (1904–1969) – Son-in-law of Matajirō. Served as Director General of the Japanese Defense Agency.
 Tetsugoro Iryo (1924/25–1945) – nephew of Jun'ya and cousin of Junichirō Koizumi, died a kamikaze pilot.
 Junichirō Koizumi (born 1942) – son of Jun'ya and grandson of Matajirō. Former Prime Minister of Japan.
 Kayoko Miyamoto (born 1957?) – ex-wife of Junichirō Koizumi.
 Kotaro Koizumi (born 1978) – actor, eldest son of Junichirō.
 Shinjirō Koizumi (born 1981) – politician, second son of Junichirō.
 Yoshinaga Miyamoto (born 1982) – third son of Junichirō, has never met his father.

References